Gromphadorhina oblongonota is one of four roach species in the genus Gromphadorhina, which is one of several genera collectively known as hissing cockroaches; like all members of the tribe Gromphadorhini, they are from the island of Madagascar. They are common in the pet trade, where they are known as "wide-horned hissers" and their scientific name is frequently misspelled as either oblongata or oblongonata. This species is difficult to distinguish from the common G. portentosa and is commonly confused with it, although oblongonota tends to be significantly larger and somewhat darker than portentosa.

As pets
All four known Gromphadorhina species are widely kept as exotic pets, with G. portentosa being arguably the most common. Many pet dealers, unaware of the fact that there are four species in the genus, classify their stock as portentosa, even though they are selling oblongonota, mixtures of portentosa and oblongonota, or hybrids of these two species.

References

Cockroaches
Endemic fauna of Madagascar
Insects described in 1973